The 1964 Hillingdon Council election took place on 7 May 1964 to elect members of Hillingdon London Borough Council in London, England. The whole council was up for election and the Labour party gained control of the council.

Background
These elections were the first to the newly formed borough. Previously elections had taken place in the Municipal Borough of Uxbridge, Hayes and Harlington Urban District, Ruislip-Northwood Urban District and Yiewsley and West Drayton Urban District. These boroughs and districts were joined to form the new London Borough of Hillingdon by the London Government Act 1963.

A total of 162 candidates stood in the election for the 60 seats being contested across 18 wards. These included a full slate from the Conservative and Labour parties, while the Liberals stood 33 candidates. Other candidates included 5 Independents and 4 Communists. There were 10 three-seat wards, 7 four-seat wards and 1 two-seat ward.

This election had aldermen as well as directly elected councillors.  Labour got 7 aldermen and the Conservatives 3.

The Council was elected in 1964 as a "shadow authority" but did not start operations until 1 April 1965.

Election result
The results saw Labour gain the new council with a majority of 12 after winning 36 of the 60 seats. Overall turnout in the election was 43.4%. This turnout included 769 postal votes.

Ward results

References

1964
1964 London Borough council elections